Charles Henry Bewley (12 July 1888 – 1969) was an Irish diplomat.

Raised in a famous Dublin Quaker business family, he embraced Irish Republicanism and Roman Catholicism. He was the Irish envoy to Berlin who reportedly thwarted efforts to obtain visas for Jews wanting to leave Nazi Germany in the 1930s and to move to the safety of the Irish Free State.

Family and early life
He was born into a wealthy privileged family, the eldest of four brothers, in Dublin, Ireland. His mother was Elizabeth Eveleen Pim. Her family owned a large department store in George's Street, Dublin. His father was physician Dr. Henry Theodore Bewley (1860-1945), related to the family that operated the successful "Bewley's cafés" chain of coffee houses in Dublin that is still famous today. His parents were both Quakers; Charles and his brothers were raised as Quakers.

He was educated at Park House, a boarding school in England. In 1901 he won a scholarship to Winchester College. He became the Library Prefect. This honour was withdrawn when he declared in a debate that "England is not a musical nation" and he ridiculed the anthem "God save the King". He proceeded to New College, Oxford, where he read Law. In 1910 he won the Newdigate Prize for poetry. He completed his training as a barrister at King's Inns, Dublin, and in 1914 he was called to the bar.

Charles' brother Kenneth also attended Oxford University. Kenneth was a career civil servant in H.M. Treasury. His younger brothers, Geoffrey and Maurice, studied medicine at Trinity College, Dublin.

Charles Bewley was seen as an "enfant terrible". He rejected his Anglo-Irish heritage and embraced Celtic mythology of the kind popularised by W. B. Yeats. He spoke against the 'evils of Anglicization', supported the Boers and converted to Roman Catholicism. He rejected Unionist politics and supported the Home Rule movement.

Career
At the outbreak of the Great War in 1914 he was in Ireland as a defending barrister for many nationalists and republicans. He wrote Seán Mac Eoin's death-sentence speech. In the 1918 general election he stood, unsuccessfully, as a Sinn Féin candidate. During the Irish civil war, he took the treaty side. As a barrister he prosecuted many anti-Treaty prisoners.

Between the truce in the Irish War of Independence and the treaty being signed, he was Irish consul in Berlin with responsibility for trade. He was appointed Irish ambassador to the Vatican (resident minister to the Holy See) in 1929. At that time, Irish diplomatic appointments were meant to be made by the British King. Bewley frequently flouted the diplomatic niceties by ignoring the implications of that. The complaints of H.J. Chilton, the British representative, and of Sir R. Clive, his successor, if anything improved Bewley's reputation in Ireland.

In July 1933 the British Foreign Office got annoyed when the Pope knighted Bewley into the Order of the Grand Cross of St Gregory the Great, as the King's agreement had not been sought. They told Bewley, with no effect, that as a King's representative he was not entitled to wear the decoration without royal permission.

However, the constant bickering between the Irish and British representatives to the Vatican pleased neither Dublin nor London. It paved the way for Bewley to obtain the appointment he really wanted. He went to Berlin in July 1933. President of Germany, Hindenburg, praised his impeccable German.

His reports from Berlin enthusiastically praised National Socialism and Chancellor Hitler. He gave interviews to German papers, which were anti-British. In Berlin he annoyed the British embassy. He ignored the King's jubilee celebrations in 1935. With the ending of the economic war and the return of the treaty ports, there were good relations between Ireland and Britain. Bewley was then frequently reprimanded by Dublin, who were no longer amused at his anti-British jibes .

Anti-Semitism
The first indication that Bewley was anti-Semitic was in Berlin in 1921. The new Irish state was not yet formally recognised. Bewley was the Irish consul for trade. Michael Collins sent Robert Briscoe to buy guns. At the time, Briscoe was an IRA quartermaster. In time he would play an important political role and would be the first Jewish Lord Mayor of Dublin. Bewley and Briscoe went to a Jewish-owned music hall in the Tauenzien Palast, but, after Briscoe left, it was reported that Bewley insulted Judaism and was thrown out. There was a drunken brawl. John Chartres, the head of the Irish Bureau, was going to take action, but the Irish Civil War broke out. Briscoe took the anti-Treaty side (which lost), while Bewley returned to Dublin, took the pro-treaty side and prosecuted anti-Treaty prisoners in the courts.

In March 1922 George Gavan Duffy wrote to Ernest Blythe opposing Bewley's appointment as an Irish envoy to Germany: "...there is a great objection to appointing him to such a post in Germany, because his semitic [sic] convictions are so pronounced that it would be very difficult for him to deal properly with all the persons and questions within the scope of an Envoy to Berlin, where the Jewish element is very strong." Gavan Duffy suggested instead that Munich or Vienna might be more suitable, "... as the same considerations would not arise in those places".

It is believed Bewley's hatred towards Jews was partly influenced by what some consider controversial teachings of Irish Catholic priest Denis Fahey. He once referred to Fahey's pamphlet 'The rulers of Russia' when being interviewed by the Irish Minister for External Affairs Joseph Walshe,  while he was serving as an envoy to Berlin.

Envoy to Berlin
Bewley was the "Irish Minister Plenipotentiary and Envoy Extraordinary" in Berlin in the crucial years from 1933 to 1939. Reading his reports to Dublin during the 1930s gives the impression that German Jews were not threatened; that they were involved in pornography, abortion and "the international white slave traffic". This was also the man responsible for processing visa applications from Jews wishing to leave Germany for Ireland. He explained the Nuremberg Laws "As the Chancellor pointed out, it amounts to the making of the Jews into a national minority; and as they themselves claim to be a separate race, they should have nothing to complain of." He reports that he had no knowledge of any "deliberate cruelty on the part of the [German] Government ... towards the Jews". He criticised Irish refugee policy as "inordinately liberal, and facilitating the entry of the wrong class of people" (meaning Jews). The Irish legation in Berlin consisted of two people, Bewley and a German secretary called Frau Kamberg. This German lady appeared more concerned than Bewley. Fewer than a hundred Jews obtained Irish visas between 1933 and 1939. Bewley was dismissed from his position in 1939.

Later years
Bewley was dismissed just as World War II was breaking out, and never received a pension. However, Joseph Goebbels gave him a job writing propaganda. For a time he worked for a Swedish news agency, which was part of Goebbels' propaganda machine.

He was next heard of at the end of the War, being held by British troops. He was picked up in Merano, Northern Italy, in May 1945 and held in Terni. He was carrying Irish diplomatic papers identifying him as the Irish minister to Berlin and to the Vatican. Joseph Walshe, Secretary of the Department of External Affairs, and Sir John Maffey, the British diplomatic representative in independent Ireland, decided on a most appropriate solution, given Bewley's ego.

At that time, passports had an entry "trade or profession". Charles Bewley was issued with a new Irish passport, which had, for that entry "a person of no importance". At the end of the war, checkpoints were frequent. It was necessary to produce passports. He never produced this passport. He was released in Rome, and apparently never left. He wrote some newspaper articles and a biography of Hermann Göring 1956.

In his final years he and Mgr Hugh O'Flaherty, 'the Vatican Pimpernel' who had rescued thousands of Jews and escaped POWs from the Nazis, became great friends. Charles Henry Bewley died unmarried in Rome in 1969.

References

Further reading
C. Bewley, Memoirs of a Wild Goose, edited by W.J. McCormack, Dublin 1989,
D. Keogh, Jews in 20th-Century Ireland: Refugees, Anti-Semitism and the Holocaust, Cork 1998,
Mervyn O'Driscoll Ireland, Germany and the Nazis: politics and diplomacy, 1919–1939 Four Courts Press, Dublin 2004
Robert Tracy, The Jews of Ireland Judaism: A Quarterly Journal of Jewish Life and Thought. Summer, 1999
Andreas Roth, Mr Bewley in Berlin – Aspects of the Career of an Irish Diplomat, 1933–1939 Four Courts Press, Dublin, 2000
 Lost report reveals our man in Berlin was Nazi apologist — Sunday Independent newspaper article by Andrew Bushe, 26 November 2006

1888 births
1969 deaths
Antisemitism in Ireland
Alumni of King's Inns
Alumni of New College, Oxford
Ambassadors of Ireland to Germany
Ambassadors of Ireland to the Holy See
Charles
Irish Quakers
Former Quakers
Converts to Roman Catholicism from Quakerism
Irish Roman Catholics
Irish barristers
Irish collaborators with Nazi Germany
Irish people of World War II
Knights Grand Cross of the Order of St Gregory the Great
Nazi propagandists
People educated at Winchester College
People of the Irish Civil War (Pro-Treaty side)